The Dessa Dawn Formation is a geologic formation in Alberta. It preserves fossils dating back to the Carboniferous period.

See also

 List of fossiliferous stratigraphic units in Alberta

References
 

Carboniferous Alberta
Carboniferous southern paleotropical deposits